Margaret of Bohemia (29 September 1373 – 4 June 1410) was the younger daughter of Holy Roman Emperor Charles IV and his fourth wife Elizabeth of Pomerania. Her siblings included Anne of Bohemia and Holy Roman Emperor Sigismund.

Biography 
In 1381, Margaret married John III, Burgrave of Nuremberg. The marriage only produced one child:

 Elizabeth of Nuremberg (1391–1429), who married Eberhard III, Count of Württemberg, and had issue.

Margaret died in 1410, aged thirty-six, and her husband died ten years later in 1420; he did not remarry after Margaret's premature death.

Her daughter Elizabeth gave birth to a granddaughter, also called Elizabeth. The younger Elizabeth was engaged to Albert III, Duke of Bavaria, but instead married John III of Werdenberg.

|-

|-

Ancestry 

1373 births
1410 deaths
Bohemian princesses
House of Luxembourg
Burgraves of Nuremberg
House of Hohenzollern
14th-century Bohemian people
14th-century German nobility
15th-century Bohemian people
15th-century German nobility
14th-century Bohemian women
14th-century German women
15th-century Bohemian women
15th-century German women
German princesses
Daughters of emperors
Burials at Heilsbronn Abbey
Children of Charles IV, Holy Roman Emperor
Daughters of kings